Bonnechere Valley is a township municipality in Renfrew County, Ontario, Canada. It had a population of 3,674 in the Canada 2016 Census. It was established in 2001 by amalgamation of the village of Eganville and the townships of Grattan, Sebastapol and South Algona.

Communities
The administrative and commercial centre of Bonnechere Valley is Eganville, a small community occupying a deep limestone valley carved at the Fifth Chute of the Bonnechere River.

The township also comprises the smaller communities of Augsburg, Castile, Clontarf, Constant Creek, Cormac, Dacre, Donegal, Esmonde, Grattan, Lake Clear, McGrath, Perrault, Ruby, Silver Lake, Scotch Bush, Vanbrugh, Woermke and Zadow, as well as the ghost towns of Newfoundout, Balaclava and Foymount.

History
The power of the Bonnechere River has been harnessed since 1848 but it was John Egan's grist mill that gets credit for stimulating the area's economic growth.

In 1911, the Great Fire destroyed many of the buildings in Eganville. 75 homes were lost in all along with schools, churches and industries along both sides on the Bonnechere River. This fire was started by two teenagers smoking cigarettes in a shed.  A year later, the Municipal Building was erected, and served as the village post office for almost a century.  This building has since become the home of the Bonnechere Museum and one of the most well known symbols of Eganville.

Demographics 

See also
List of townships in Ontario

References

External links

Lower-tier municipalities in Ontario
Municipalities in Renfrew County
Township municipalities in Ontario